James "Jay" McGuiness (born 24 July 1990) is a British singer, songwriter and actor best known as a vocalist with boy band The Wanted. In 2015, partnered with Aliona Vilani, he won the 13th series of BBC's Strictly Come Dancing.

In recent years, McGuiness has forged a career in musical theatre starring in BIG! The Musical at The Dominion theatre in London's West End, Sleepless - A Musical romance at the Troubador theatre and Rip It Up at The Garrick theatre. In 2022 McGuiness took the lead role of Bob Wallace in the touring musical version of the classic movie White Christmas. Mcguiness is a committed conservationist and environmentalist.

Early life
McGuiness grew up in Newark, Nottinghamshire, and attended All Saints RC School, Mansfield. He has a fraternal twin brother, Thomas and three other siblings.

From the age of 12, he pursued his love of performing by attending the Charlotte Hamilton School of Dance in Newark. As his love for the performing arts grew he attended the prestigious Midlands Academy of Dance and Drama in Carlton near Nottingham.

Career
McGuiness is known as one fifth of Anglo-Irish boy band The Wanted. He has been a member of the band since 2010, alongside Max George, Siva Kaneswaran, Tom Parker and Nathan Sykes. He discovered the band by Googling 'auditions' and getting two results, one for a circus and one for the band.

In the autumn of 2015, Jay McGuiness took part in the BBC’s Strictly Come Dancing, ultimately being crowned the winner and collecting the famous glitterball trophy on December 19th.

In October 2017, McGuiness won the first series of Celebrity Hunted alongside bandmate Siva Kaneswaran.

In October 2018 McGuiness appeared at the London Palladium in the show Rip it Up the 60s, alongside Harry Judd, Aston Merrygold and Louis Smith. The show then transferred to the Garrick Theatre.

October 2019 saw McGuiness land the leading role in the West End musical BIG!, playing the role of Josh Baskin, made famous by Tom hanks in the hit movie.

In August 2020, Mcguiness again took the lead role of Sam in Sleepless, A Musical romance at the Troubadour theatre. 

In 2022, Jay Mcguiness starred in the touring production of White Christmas playing the role of Bob Wallace.

Also in 2022, Jay took part in and won Richard Osman's House of Games on BBC television, following a tense daily battle with fellow contestant Bobby Seagull

Strictly Come Dancing
On 24 August 2015, McGuiness was confirmed as a celebrity contestant in the BBC's Strictly Come Dancing. He was partnered with professional dancer Aliona Vilani. In the third week of competition, he was awarded a total of 37 points out of 40, the highest week 3 score in the history of the competition, for his jive, receiving the first 10 of the series. In week 6, he danced an American Smooth to "Li'l Red Riding Hood" by Sam the Sham and the Pharaohs and scored 34, putting him in second place by only one point. In week 10 he danced a tango to "When Doves Cry" by Prince and scored 38. In Week 11 he danced a rumba to "Falling Slowly", from the musical Once, and scored 39, putting him at the top. In the semi-final his Charleston scored 37. In the final, on 19 December 2015, the couple danced a quickstep to "My Generation" by The Who, scoring 36, a showdance to "Can't Feel My Face" by The Weeknd, scoring 35, and a pasodoble to "It's My Life" by Bon Jovi, scoring 39. In the public vote the couple were voted the series winners, gaining the Glitterball trophy.

In 2020, the BBC ran an audience poll for the greatest Strictly dance of all time as part of the 2020 Christmas special. Jay's ‘Pulp Fiction’ Jive topped the poll as viewers favourite Strictly routine ever. 
Strictly Come Dancing performances

Personal life
McGuiness is vegetarian, although he has described himself as "not a militant vegetarian by any means". He was named PETA's Sexiest Male Vegetarian Celebrity in 2013.
He can play the drums.

Filmography

Stage

References

1990 births
English pop singers
Strictly Come Dancing winners
Living people
People from Newark-on-Trent
21st-century English singers
The Wanted members